Chicago and Southern Air Lines (C&S) was a United States airline that started life as Pacific Seaboard Air Lines in California and was organized on June 15, 1933.  Following the move from California, the airline's headquarters were initially located in St. Louis, Missouri and were then moved to Memphis, Tennessee, which also served as a hub for the carrier.  C&S was merged into
Delta Air Lines in 1953, thus providing Delta with its first international routes.

History
The first service was operated by Pacific Seaboard Air Lines on June 23, 1933, in Carleton Putnam's single engine Bellanca CH-300 "Miss San Jose." Putnam held a Transport Pilot's license. Three Bellanca CH-300s were flown in the California operation. The new airline only flew passengers on the West Coast of California on "The Scenic Route." This route was up the coast of California from Los Angeles (Grand Central Air Terminal at Glendale) to San Francisco's Mills Field. Stops were made at seven destinations located near or on the Pacific Ocean including Santa Barbara, CA, Santa Maria, CA, San Luis Obispo, CA, Paso Robles, CA, Monterey, CA, Salinas, CA and San Jose, CA.  For a short period, Pacific Seaboard Air Lines also flew from San Francisco to the capital of California, Sacramento. The primary competition on the L.A.-San Francisco route was United Airlines with twin-engine, ten-passenger, Boeing 247s. United, which also flew the San Joaquin Valley route in California, had the U.S. Air Mail contract and more comfortable aircraft. Putnam decided the only way he could stay in business was to get a U.S. Air Mail contract. In four months and one week, 1113 passengers were carried.

Airmail operations
On February 9, 1934, President Franklin D. Roosevelt canceled all the U.S. Mail contracts. The U.S. Army operated the air postal service for a few weeks, and then the government called for new bids on the Air Mail routes. Putnam bid on and received the Air Mail route between Chicago and New Orleans by way of Peoria, Springfield, St. Louis, Memphis, and Jackson (Air Mail Route 8). Two more Bellanca CH-300s were purchased, bringing that fleet to five aircraft. Putnam had to start service in 30 days or forfeit his $50,000 performance bond. Air mail service started June 3, 1934, and passenger service started June 13 with the five Bellancas on "The Valley Level Route." The airline changed its name to Chicago and Southern Air Lines in 1935.  The June 1, 1940, Chicago & Southern timetable described the "Valley Level Route" as being "900 Miles of Flat Country" between Chicago and New Orleans via Memphis, with "Fine Airports" and "A Splendid Airway".

Passenger services

Chicago and Southern continued flying north to south routes in the Midwest, bringing air service to smaller markets such as Evansville, Indiana, and Paducah, Kentucky. The airline acquired its first Douglas DC-3 in 1940 and continued to operate the type until the 1953 merger with Delta Air Lines. Some four-engined Douglas DC-4s were also operated postwar.

From 1946, the DC-4s were used to commence international services from Houston and New Orleans to Havana, Cuba; Santo Domingo (which was known as Ciudad Trujillo from 1930 to 1961), Dominican Republic; Kingston, Jamaica and Caracas, Venezuela.  The February 1, 1947 Chicago & Southern system timetable route map includes all of these destinations as well as Aruba, Netherlands Antilles; Camaguey, Cuba; Curacao, Netherlands Antilles; Port au Prince, Haiti and San Juan, Puerto Rico; however, it appears that although passenger traffic rights may have been granted or applied for, these additional destinations were not being served at this time.

In October 1950 C&S took delivery of the first of six Lockheed L-649A Constellations. These larger pressurised airliners were placed in service from Chicago and St Louis to Houston, Memphis, New Orleans, Havana, Kingston, and Caracas.

On 10 January 1953 a new service from New Orleans to San Juan, Puerto Rico was inaugurated.  According to the C&S  timetable, this service was named the "Hai-Drico Rocket" and was operated once a week with a "New Luxury Constellation" on a southbound routing of Memphis - New Orleans - Port au Prince, Haiti - Ciudad Trujillo, Dominican Republic (now Santo Domingo) - San Juan with the return northbound flight continuing on from Memphis to St. Louis and Chicago.

Destinations in 1950

According to the October 1, 1950 Chicago & Southern Air Lines system timetable, the air carrier was serving the following domestic and international destinations:

Domestic

 Beaumont/Port Arthur, TX
 Chicago, IL - Midway Airport
 Detroit, MI
 Fort Wayne, IN
 El Dorado, AR
 Evansville, IN
 Greenwood, MS
 Hot Springs, AR
 Houston, TX - Hobby Airport
 Indianapolis, IN
 Jackson, MS
 Kansas City, MO
 Little Rock, AR
 Memphis, TN - Hub & airline headquarters
 New Orleans, LA
 Paducah, KY
 Pine Bluff, AR
 St. Louis, MO
 Shreveport, LA
 Springfield, MO
 Terre Haute, IN 
 Toledo, OH

The airline also previously served Peoria, IL during the mid-1940s.

International

 Caracas, Venezuela
 Havana, Cuba
 Kingston, Jamaica

Aruba and Curacao in the Netherlands Antilles as well as Montego Bay, Jamaica all appeared on the route map of the above referenced Chicago & Southern system timetable dated October 1, 1950; however, this same timetable does not list any scheduled services operated by the airline into these destinations at this time.

Chicago & Southern's international service at this same time was operated by a flight the airline called "The Caribbean Comet" with a Douglas DC-4 propliner flying a daily round trip routing of Chicago - St. Louis - Memphis - New Orleans - Havana - Kingston - Caracas.

Fleet in 1950

The October 1, 1950 Chicago & Southern system timetable lists three aircraft types being operated by the airline at this time:

 Douglas DC-3
 Douglas DC-4 "Skymaster'
 Lockheed Constellation (L-649A & L-749 models)

According to the C&S timetable, in 1953 Trans World Airlines (TWA) was operating the Martin 4-0-4 "Skyliner" on "thru-plane" interchange flights (see Transport hub) between Houston, Pittsburgh and New York City via an agreement with Chicago and Southern Air Lines, but the latter was no longer operating the Douglas DC-4.

Prior to 1950, Chicago & Southern operated the following aircraft types:

 Bellanca CH-300 "Pacemaker"
 Curtiss K-6 Oriole
 Lockheed Model 10 Electra (model 10B)
 Stinson T SM-6000

Merger with Delta Air Lines
On 1 May 1953, C&S merged with Delta Air Lines, which provided Delta with access to a Great Lakes route system in the upper Midwest as well as additional destinations in the south central U.S. including for the first time Houston, Texas and, importantly, to points in the Caribbean Sea region as well as Venezuela thus providing Delta with its first international routes.  The airline operated as Delta-C&S for the next two years.

Using the international route authority from New Orleans inherited from Chicago & Southern, Delta began flying one its first international jet services and in 1962 was operating then-new Convair 880 jetliners on a routing of San Francisco (SFO) - Dallas Love Field (DAL) - New Orleans (MSY) - Montego Bay, Jamaica (MBJ) - Caracas, Venezuela (CCS).  Following its acquisition of Chicago & Southern, Delta operated former C&S Lockheed Constellation aircraft as well as "Super" Convair 340 propliners on its international flights to the Caribbean and Venezuela during the mid-1950s.  By the late 1950s, Delta had replaced the Constellations and was operating Douglas DC-7 propliners on these routes in addition to the Convairs.  The airline then introduced jet service with Convair 880 aircraft followed by Douglas DC-8 jetliners including stretched Douglas DC-8-61 (Super DC-8) aircraft on the Caribbean and Venezuela routes. According to the Official Airline Guide (OAG), by late 1979 Delta was operating wide body Lockheed L-1011 TriStar flights on a daily basis nonstop between New Orleans and San Juan, Puerto Rico.

Incidents and accidents
 On August 5, 1936, Chicago and Southern Flight 4 crashed near St. Louis, Missouri.  All 8 passengers and crew were killed in the accident.

Timetables

See also 
 List of defunct airlines of the United States

Bibliography

References

External links
 airtimes.com

Defunct airlines of the United States
Airlines established in 1933
Airlines disestablished in 1953
1933 establishments in California
1953 disestablishments in Tennessee
1953 mergers and acquisitions
Airlines based in California